Purdy Township is one of twenty-five townships in Barry County, Missouri, United States. As of the 2000 census, its population was 2,031.

Geography
It contains two cemeteries: Matty and Stinett.

Transportation
Purdy Township contains two airports or landing strips: Gibbons Air Park and Ingram Private Airport.

References

 USGS Geographic Names Information System (GNIS)

External links
 US-Counties.com
 City-Data.com

Townships in Barry County, Missouri
Townships in Missouri